Charles Bigg (1840–1908) was a Church of England clergyman, theologian and church historian.

Bigg was the winner of the Gaisford Prize for Greek Prose in 1861.
In 1886, he delivered the Bampton Lectures, later published as: The Christian Platonists of Alexandria. He served as the principal of Brighton College in 1871. In 1900 he was invited by the Bishop of London, Mandell Creighton, to a round table conference that produced The Doctrine of Holy Communion and its Expression in Ritual in 1900.

After the death of Reverend William Bright, he was in April 1901 appointed Regius Professor of Ecclesiastical History at the University of Oxford, holding the post until his death.

Works
 The Christian Platonists of Alexandria : Eight lectures preached before the University of Oxford in the year 1886 on the foundation of the late Rev. John Bampton (1886)
 Neoplatonism (1895)
 The imitation of Christ : called also The ecclesiastical music (1900). Translated by Bigg.
 A critical and exegetical commentary on the Epistles of St. Peter and St. Jude (1901)
 The church's task under the Roman empire; four lectures with preface, notes, and an excursus (1905)
 Wayside sketches in ecclesiastical history; nine lectures (1906)
 The origins of Christianity (1909)
 The doctrine of the twelve Apostles (1922)

References

External links
 

1840 births
1908 deaths
19th-century English Anglican priests
Headmasters of Brighton College
Regius Professors of Ecclesiastical History
19th-century Anglican theologians
20th-century Anglican theologians